The Easter Handicap or Easter Stakes is a major horse race held at Ellerslie Racecourse in Auckland, New Zealand. It is raced over a distance of 1,600 metres (approximately 1 mile) by three-year-old and upwards thoroughbreds.

Race history

Although previously a Group 1 race, from 2017 it was reclassified to Group 2 and from 2022 to Group 3 level. 

In 2016, the conditions of the race changed from a handicap to set weight and penalties, but reverted back to handicap conditions in 2018.

The race has been won by many of New Zealand's greatest milers, including Kindergarten (twice), Sleepy Fox (four times) and Grey Way.

The Easter Handicap is now raced in late April on the same date as the Championship Stakes.

Winners Since 1965

Previous winners

1964 - Tasman Sea
1963 - Final Command
1962 - Otematata
1961 - Waipari
1960 - Waipari
1959 - Marie Brizard
1958 - Japonica
1957 - Solepic
1956 - Coleridge
1955 - Fair Chance
1954 - Tesla
1953 - Misprint
1952 - Peter Boy
1951 - Wandering Ways
1950 - Lord Revel
1949 - Rosslare
1948 - Iwo Jima
1947 - Sleepy Fox
1946 - Sleepy Fox
1945 - Sleepy Fox
1944 - Sleepy Fox
1943 - Landveyor
1942 - Kindergarten
1941 - Kindergarten
1940 - Black Thread
1939 - Beaupartir
1938 - Francis Drake
1937 - Tooley Street
1936 - Royal Appellant
1935 - Red Manfred
1934 - Jonathan
1933 - Golden Wings
1932 - Great Star
1931 - Hunting Cry
1930 - Pegaway
1929 - Bright Glow
1928 - In The Shade
1927 - Civility
1926 - Reremoana
1925 - Reremoana
1924 - Hipo
1923 - Roseday
1922 - Grotesque
1921 - Silver Link
1920 - Gazique
1919 - Uncle Ned
1918 - Parisian Diamond
1917 - Menelaus
1916 - Chortle
1915 - Merry Roe
1914 - Ventura
1913 - Jack Delaval
1912 - Kakama
1911 - Antoinette
1910 - Waiari
1909 - Aborigine
1908 - Gold Crest
1907 - Waipuna
1906 - Mobility
1905 - Scotty
1904 - Regulation
1903 - Golden Rose
1902 - Nonette
1901 - Rosella
1900 - Advance
1899 - Rex
1898 - Rex
1897 - Day Star
1896 - Acone
1895 - Folly
1894 - Lottie
1893 - Impulse
1892 - Cynisca
1891 - Impulse
1890 - Hilda
1889 - Leorina
1888 - Friendship
1887 - Spade Guinea
1886 - Clogs
1885 - Turquoise
1884 - Radames/The Administrator
1883 - Leonora
1882 - Louie
1881 - King Quail
1880 - Yatapa
1879 - Yatapa
1878 - Elsa
1877 - Bide A Wee
1876 - Parawhenua
1875 - Yatterina
1874 - Batter

See also

 Thoroughbred racing in New Zealand
 Championship Stakes
 Awapuni Gold Cup
 Zabeel Classic
 New Zealand Stakes

References

External links
 Youtube video - Champion racehorse Grey Way winning the 1977 Easter Handicap

Horse races in New Zealand
Open mile category horse races